Julio Daniel Asad (born 7 June 1953) is an Argentine former football player and manager. He played as a midfielder, and participated with Argentina in the 1975 Copa América.

Asad was nicknamed "El Turco" due to his Syrian and Lebanese ethnicity. In Argentina, Arabs were mistakenly called Turks, since they came to Argentina with Ottoman Turkish documents in the 1900s. After he retired from professional football, he became a manager. He has coached clubs in Argentina, Ecuador, Saudi Arabia, and El Salvador.

He is the uncle of Omar Asad, who was also a successful player for Vélez in the 1990s.

Honours

Manager 
Club Deportivo Riestra
1985 Champion

Defensores de Belgrano
1991-1992 Champions

Club Leandro N. Alem
Clausura 1996 Champions

Centro Deportivo Olmedo
2000 Champions

Club Deportivo Cuenca
2004 ChampionsAl-Nasr2008 Prince Faisal CupPersonal'''
2000 Coach Of The Year in Ecuador
2001 Coach Of The Year in Ecuador
2003 Coach Of The Year in Saudi Arabia

References

External links

1953 births
Footballers from Buenos Aires
Association football midfielders
Argentine footballers
Argentine people of Syrian descent
Argentine people of Lebanese descent
Sportspeople of Lebanese descent
Club Atlético Colón footballers
Club Atlético Vélez Sarsfield footballers
Racing Club de Avellaneda footballers
Argentina international footballers
1975 Copa América players
Argentine football managers
L.D.U. Quito managers
C.S. Emelec managers
C.D. Cuenca managers
S.D. Quito managers
C.D. FAS managers
Argentine Primera División players
Living people
Expatriate football managers in El Salvador
Argentine expatriate sportspeople in El Salvador
Defensores de Belgrano managers
Al Nassr FC managers
C.D. El Nacional managers
S.D. Aucas managers
C.S.D. Independiente del Valle managers
Mushuc Runa S.C. managers
C.D. Olmedo managers